Ed "Citizen" Hauser (April 29, 1961 – November 14, 2008) was a citizen activist in the Cleveland, Ohio area.

Biography

Early life and education
Hauser was the fourth of five children born to Walter and the late Theresia Hauser. He graduated from Maple Heights High School in 1979 and Cleveland State University in 1990.

An electrical engineer by training, Hauser was laid off by LTV Steel on December 10, 2001 along with all his co-workers. As an LTV employee, he routinely published articles to educate the public about the Whiskey Island.  Thousands of dollars of his money was spent to save Whiskey Island. His appreciation for Lake Erie and the Cuyahoga River led him to fight for the protection of Whiskey Island, the scenic spit of shoreline where the Cuyahoga River meets Lake Erie.

Career
Hauser championed the preservation of natural landmarks and public access to these resources.  As the head of Friends of Whiskey Island, Hauser fought to protect the last piece of natural shoreline in Cleveland. Hauser collected signatures for petitions, represented the public interest at hundreds of commission meetings and other events. He spent his personal funds, including from his retirement plan, as part of a campaign from 1998 to 2005 to preserve  of Whiskey Island as a park while blocking the expansion plans of the Cleveland-Cuyahoga County Port Authority.

In addition to protecting Whiskey Island, Hauser also served as a citizen watchdog on Port Authority activities, championed a steel museum in Steelyard Commons, was vocal about Cleveland's lakefront plans and petitioned the lack of public referendum for the Cuyahoga County Medical Mart tax.

Death and afterward
Ed Hauser died on November 14, 2008 from heart failure.

References

External links
Ed Hauser, 47, environmental activist who fought to preserve Whiskey Island - Cleveland Plain Dealer, Nov 16th, 2008
Cuyahoga County Planning Commission
Friends of Whiskey Island
Rest in Peace Citizen Hauser - Compilation of tributes from his friends and colleagues at REALNEO
Ed’s blog on REALNEO
Ed Hauser interview with Meet The Bloggers 08/28/06
Citizen Hauser - Short excerpt from the documentary film 'Citizen Hauser' - by Blue Hole Productions (2006)
Citizen Hauser film on WorldCat
Ed "citizen" Hauser, rest in peace - A tribute to Ed on GreenCityBlueLake
Bringing the pain - Cleveland Magazine article about Ed, May 2008
A Conversation with "Citizen" Ed Hauser - Interview on CoolCleveland
"Citizen" Ed Hauser Replies - Ed's follow-up editorial to his CoolCleveland interview
Whiskey Island's Future - Cleveland Free Times article, June 11, 2003

1961 births
2008 deaths
American environmentalists
Cleveland State University alumni
People from Cleveland
Activists from Ohio